Derrick Lamont Gibson (born February 5, 1975) is an American former professional baseball outfielder who played for two seasons. He played for the Colorado Rockies of the Major League Baseball (MLB) for seven games in left field during the 1998 Colorado Rockies season and ten games in right field during the 1999 Colorado Rockies season.

External links
, or Retrosheet, or Pelota Binaria

1975 births
Living people
African-American baseball players
American expatriate baseball players in Canada
American expatriate baseball players in Mexico
Arizona League Rockies players
Baseball players from Florida
Bend Rockies players
Calgary Cannons players
Colorado Rockies players
Duluth-Superior Dukes players
El Paso Diablos players
Long Island Ducks players
Major League Baseball outfielders
Mexican League baseball outfielders
Mississippi Braves players
New Haven County Cutters players
New Haven Ravens players
Pastora de los Llanos players
American expatriate baseball players in Venezuela
People from Winter Haven, Florida
Pericos de Puebla players
Richmond Braves players
Salt Lake Stingers players
Tucson Sidewinders players
21st-century African-American sportspeople
20th-century African-American sportspeople